"Blew" is a song by American rock band Nirvana, written by vocalist and guitarist Kurt Cobain. It is the first song on the band's debut album Bleach, released in June 1989 by Sub Pop. 

The song was re-released by the Tupelo record label as the title track of a four-song Nirvana EP in the United Kingdom in November 1989, where it charted at number 15 on the UK Indie Singles chart.

Origin and recording
Written in 1988, "Blew" was first performed live at the Community World Theatre in Tacoma, Washington on March 19, 1988. 

The song was first recorded in the studio by Jack Endino at Reciprocal Recording Studios in Seattle, Washington in June 1988, during the recording sessions for what became the band's debut single, "Love Buzz".

Bleach and Blew EP

A second studio version was recorded by Endino at Reciprocal in December 1988, and was released on Bleach in June 1989.

The Bleach version of "Blew" was accidentally recorded one step lower than the band had intended, which contributed to what Nirvana biographer Michael Azerrad called its "extraordinarily heavy sound". Not realizing that they had already tuned to their favored D Standard tuning, the band tuned further down to Drop C on the first day of the sessions and recorded several songs in that tuning. As bassist Krist Novoselic recalled in a 2009 Seattle Times article, "we came back the next day and decided the idea wasn't so hot, and we recorded over most of it with things tuned back up a little. In fact, 'Blew,' with that growly bass, is the only survivor of that experiment."

The Bleach version of "Blew" was re-released on the Blew EP in December 1989, along with the Bleach mix of "Love Buzz" and the previously-unreleased songs "Been a Son" and "Stain", which had been recorded by Steve Fisk at Music Source in Seattle, Washington in August 1989. The band's original plan had been to release an EP to promote their current European tour, but the EP was delayed and released exclusively in the United Kingdom after the tour was over. However, the EP built on the interest the band had generated in the UK with Bleach, and was promoted by English DJ John Peel, who had also played Bleach on his influential show. The Blew EP eventually peaked at number 15 on the UK Indie chart.

Post-Bleach

"Blew" remained one of only three songs from Bleach, along with "About a Girl" and "School," that the band performed until Cobain's suicide in April 1994. It was performed for the final time live at Nirvana's last show, at Terminal Einz in Munich, Germany on March 1, 1994, as the second-to-last song, preceding "Heart-Shaped Box".

Composition and lyrics
In his 1993 Nirvana biography Come As You Are: The Story of Nirvana, Azerrad described the song as having a "theme of entrapment and control."

Release and reception

In 2009, Novoselic said that "Blew" was perhaps his favorite song on Bleach "because it has a groove, and again, it's the sole survivor of the Doom Pop experiment."

In 2015, Rolling Stone's listed "Blew" at number 22 on their ranking of 102 Nirvana songs.

EP

The Blew EP was released in December 1989 on Tupelo Records on 12" vinyl and CD. With a working title of Winnebago, the EP was originally intended to be released to promote an upcoming European tour, but due to delays in production,  the maxi-single ended up being released exclusively in the United Kingdom shortly after the tour's completion.

The Blew EP was released only in the UK and was difficult to obtain elsewhere. Only 3,000 copies of the maxi-single were pressed on 12" vinyl and CD. Both vinyl and CD counterfeit copies exist, with the vinyl copies varying in color. The official 12" vinyl was pressed only on black vinyl. The cover art was photographed by Cobain's then-girlfriend Tracy Marander at a May 26, 1989 concert at the Green River Community College in Auburn, Washington. The back cover photo was also by Marander.

"Stain" was re-released by DGC Records in December 1992, on the band's rarities compilation, Incesticide. The Blew version of "Been a Son", hailed by Kurt St. Thomas as the "definitive take" due to its trashy sound and pronounced bass solo, remained a rarity until it was re-released in October 2002 on the band's first best-of compilation, Nirvana.

Track listing

"Blew" and "Love Buzz" were previously released on Nirvana's 1989 debut album Bleach, but "Love Buzz" was not included on the original 1989 UK version. In its place was "Big Cheese", the B-side to the US "Love Buzz" single. Therefore, the Blew EP was the first time that "Love Buzz" was officially released in the UK. However, "Love Buzz" was included on the 1992 UK re-issue of Bleach.
"Been a Son" was later released on the 2002 "best-of" compilation, Nirvana. A different version appeared on the 1992 compilation, Incesticide.
"Stain" was later released on Incesticide.

Charts

Other releases
A live version, recorded at the Pine Street Theatre in Portland, Oregon on February 9, 1990, was released in November 2009 on the 20th anniversary "Deluxe" version of Bleach, which featured the complete Pine Street show as bonus material.
A live version, recorded at the Paramount Theatre in Seattle on October 31, 1991, appeared on the live video Live at the Paramount, released in September 2011.
A live version, recorded at the Paradiso in Amsterdam, Netherlands on November 25, 1991, appeared as the final track on the live compilation, From the Muddy Banks of the Wishkah, in November 1996. Video of this version of the song was released in November 2006, when it appeared on the bonus disc of DVD release of Live! Tonight! Sold Out!!. The full Paradiso show was released on CD and Blu Ray on the 30th anniversary "Deluxe" and "Super Deluxe" versions of Nevermind in November 2021. 
The 30th anniversary "Deluxe" and "Super Deluxe" versions of Nevermind also featured live performances of "Blew" from the band's shows at  The Palace in Melbourne, Australia on February 1, 1992, and the Nakano Sunplaza in Tokyo, Japan on February 19, 1992.
A live version, from the band's appearance at the 1992 Reading Festival in Reading, England on August 30, 1992, was released on CD and DVD on Live at Reading in November 2009.
A live version, from the band's performance on December 13, 1993 at Pier 48 in Seattle, Washington, recorded for MTV, was released on the live video Live and Loud in September 2013.

Unreleased versions
The original studio version, recorded during the sessions for the "Love Buzz" single at Reciprocal in Seattle in June 1988, has never appeared on an official release.

Personnel
Nirvana
Kurt Cobain – guitar, vocals
Krist Novoselic – bass guitar
Chad Channing – drums

Production
Jack Endino – production for "Blew" and "Love Buzz"
Steve Fisk – production for "Stain" and "Been a Son"

Covers
Japanese musician Miyavi covered the song.
American pop-punk band The Ergs! covered the song on their Blue EP.
Northern Irish alternative rock band Ash covered the song, releasing it on their Numbskull EP in 1999.
Istanbul rock band Direc-t's singer Bilge Kosebalaban covered the song.

See also
Experiencing Nirvana: Grunge in Europe, 1989

References

External links
Blew EP on Nirvanadiscography.com
Live Nirvana Companion to Official Releases – Blew EP
Live Nirvana Sessions History – September 1989

1989 debut EPs
Nirvana (band) EPs
Sub Pop EPs
American garage rock songs
Albums produced by Jack Endino
Albums produced by Steve Fisk